Leucobryum juniperoideum is a species of mosses belonging to the family Leucobryaceae.

It has cosmopolitan distribution.

References

Dicranales